|}

The Eternal Stakes is a Listed flat horse race in Great Britain open to fillies aged three years only.
It is run at Carlisle over a distance of 6 furlongs and 195 yards (1,383 metres), and it is scheduled to take place each year in June.

The race was first run in 2003 at Warwick.  It was staged at Newmarket in 2014 and was run at Carlisle for the first time in 2015.

Records
Leading jockey (3 wins):
 Kieren Fallon – Lucky Spin (2004), Seta (2010), Khor Sheed (2011)
 Richard Kingscote – Clifton Dancer (2008), Excilly (2015), Meu Amor (2021)

Leading trainer (2 wins):
 Luca Cumani - Seta (2010), Khor Sheed (2011) 
 Ed McMahon - Radio Gaga (2012), Winning Express (2013) 
 Ralph Beckett - Evita Peron (2014), Meu Amor (2021)

Winners

See also
 Horse racing in Great Britain
 List of British flat horse races

References

Racing Post:

Flat races in Great Britain
Carlisle Racecourse
Flat horse races for three-year-old fillies
Recurring sporting events established in 2003
2003 establishments in England